Friedrichswalde is a municipality in the district of Barnim in Brandenburg in Germany. It is situated in the Schorfheide nature reserve.

Demography

Personality 

 Friedrich Wilhelm von Redern (1802-1883), Prussian general manager and politician, owner of good Glambeck
 Paul Thränert (1875-1960), trade unionist, born in Friedrichswalde 
 Bruno Endrejat (1908-1945), resistance fighter against Nazism, born in Friedrichswalde

References

Localities in Barnim